In Mizzoura is a lost 1919 American silent Western film starring Robert Warwick and directed by Hugh Ford. This film is based on the 1890s stage play In Mizzoura by Augustus Thomas. The play was previously filmed in 1914.

Cast
 Robert Warwick as Jim Radburn
 Robert Cain as Robert Travers
 Noah Beery as Jo Vernon
 Eileen Percy as Kate Vernon
 Monte Blue as Sam Fowler
 Milla Davenport as Mrs. Vernon
 Gertrude Short as Lisbeth Vernon
 Hazel Brennon as Emily Radburn
 Victor Potel as Dave
 Robert Morris as Colonel Bollinger
 William H. Brown as Bill Sarber
 Taylor N. Duncan as Clarke (credited as Ted Duncan)
 Guy Oliver as Esrom

References

External links

 
 

1919 films
1919 Western (genre) films
Lost Western (genre) films
American films based on plays
Paramount Pictures films
American black-and-white films
Lost American films
1919 lost films
Silent American Western (genre) films
1910s American films